The Markham Royals are a Junior "A" ice hockey team from Markham, Ontario, Canada.  They are a part of the Ontario Junior Hockey League.  From 1973 until 2015, the team operated in Hamilton, Ontario as the Kilty's and the Red Wings.

History

Hamilton Red Wings/Kilty B's 1973-2015
The Red Wings were founded in 1973 as the second Hamilton-based team in the Niagara District Junior B Hockey League.

After one season, the league divided into two leagues and the Red Wings went the way of the Golden Horseshoe Junior Hockey League.  In 1975-76, the other Hamilton team joined the Southern Ontario Junior A Hockey League and became the Hamilton Mountain A's.  The draw of a local Junior A club weakened the team and they took a one-year leave a season later.

In 1977, under new ownership the team came back as the Kiltys.  Although a very competitive team, it took the Kiltys until 1992-93 to win a Golden Horseshoe championship.  With that win, the Kiltys were promoted to the newly formed Ontario Provincial Junior A Hockey League with a variety of other Junior B squads.

Outside of some brief troubles in the late 1990s, the Hamilton franchise has been very successful in regular season play in the OJHL.  The team was renamed the Hamilton Red Wings in 2002 and continues to field highly competitive teams season after season.

Markham Royals 2015-present
In the spring of 2015, the Red Wings moved to Markham, Ontario and became the Markham Royals. Markham had been without an OJHL franchise since 2012. The club also acquired the rights for Waxers Junior A, and has chosen to play as the Markham Royals.

Season-by-season results

Sutherland Cup appearances
1974: Hamilton Red Wings defeated Bramalea Blues by forfeit

Notable alumni

Marty McSorley
Keith Primeau
Pat Quinn
Jeff Reese
Zac Rinaldo
Gary Roberts
Steve Staios
 Cam Talbot
 Zach Hyman
 Chris Tanev
 Brandon Tanev

External links
Royals Webpage

Ontario Provincial Junior A Hockey League teams
Sport in Markham, Ontario
1973 establishments in Ontario
Markham Royals